CALR may refer to:
 Calreticulin, a protein that in humans is encoded by the CALR gene.
 Chief Albert Luthuli Regiment, an infantry regiment of the South African Army
 Computer-assisted legal research, a mode of legal research
 Centre for Applied Language Research at the University of Southampton
 Advisory Commission on Religious Freedom, part of the Spanish Ministry of Justice